Mental Jewelry is the second studio album by the band Live—but their first under this name; they had previously released the album The Death of a Dictionary under the name Public Affection, under which it also released the EP Divided Mind, Divided Planet. Released on December 31, 1991, it is also the band's major label debut.

Many of the songs on Mental Jewelry are based on the writings of Indian philosopher Jiddu Krishnamurti.

A music video was filmed for "Operation Spirit". The video was filmed when the band were still calling themselves Public Affection.

On June 30, 2017, Live announced a reissue of Mental Jewelry as a two-CD set, with the first CD containing the original album and the three outtakes and the second CD containing a full concert. Cassette and vinyl reissues were also announced.

Track listing

A track named "Susquehanna" was written during these sessions and often played live during the first few years of Live's career under that name, but not recorded until 1993, during the sessions for the follow-up, Throwing Copper. That version would not be released until the 25th Anniversary reissue edition of that album in 2019, however.

Charts

Album

Singles

Certifications

References

1991 debut albums
Albums produced by Jerry Harrison
Jiddu Krishnamurti
Live (band) albums
Radioactive Records albums